Clavatula caerulea is a species of sea snail, a marine gastropod mollusk in the family Clavatulidae.

Description
The length of the shell attains 20 mm. The shell is narrowly turreted and strongly keeled. The keel is tuberculated, with revolving, sometimes granulous striae below it. The granules are more apparent at the base. The color of the shell is bluish, the tubercles white, with the interstices purplish.

Distribution
This marine species occurs off Angola.

References

 Weinkauff. Conch. Cab., p. 34, pi. vii, f. 4–6, 23
 Gofas, S.; Afonso, J.P.; Brandào, M. (Ed.). (S.a.). Conchas e Moluscos de Angola = Coquillages et Mollusques d'Angola. [Shells and molluscs of Angola]. Universidade Agostinho / Elf Aquitaine Angola: Angola. 140 pp.
 Nolf F. (2011) Rehabilitation of Clavatula smithi Knudsen, 1952 (Mollusca: Gastropoda: Clavatulidae). Neptunea 10(2): 5–15.

External links

 

Endemic fauna of Angola
caerulea
Gastropods described in 1875